Mark W. Stiles Unit is a Texas Department of Criminal Justice men's prison located in an unincorporated area of Jefferson County, Texas, near Beaumont. The approximately  unit is co-located with the Gist Unit and the LeBlanc Unit.

The unit opened in June 1993. The unit serves as the University of Texas Medical Branch hub site for treatment of HIV and other infectious diseases. As a result, the Stiles facility houses many HIV positive prisoners. A hospice for prisoners with HIV opened at Stiles in 1997.

The unit has offered Buddhist meditation classes since 2003.

In 2011 the metal products plant closed; its operations were consolidated to the plants at the Coffield Unit and the Powledge Unit.

Notable prisoners
 Elmer Wayne Henley
 John Curtis Dewberry

References

External links

 "Stiles Unit." Texas Department of Criminal Justice
 Rodriguez, Brenda. "For ill prisoners, time at Beaumont's 'death camp' can be for life." San Antonio Express-News. September 14, 1997. 14A.

Prisons in Jefferson County, Texas
Buildings and structures in Jefferson County, Texas
1993 establishments in Texas